Leah Eddie (born 23 January 2001) is a Scottish footballer who plays as a defender for Hibernian in the Scottish Women's Premier League (SWPL) and the Scotland national team.

Club career
Eddie attended the Performance School at Graeme High School in Falkirk, and played for Central Ladies Academy. After a stint with Rangers she joined Hibernian in 2018. She missed most of the 2019 season due to a knee injury.

International career
Eddie represented Scotland at the under-17 and under-19 levels. She was added to the full national team in June 2021 and made her international debut that month in a 1–0 win against Northern Ireland.

References 

2001 births
Living people
Scottish women's footballers
Rangers W.F.C. players 
Hibernian W.F.C. players 
Scottish Women's Premier League players
Women's association football defenders
People educated at Graeme High School
Scotland women's international footballers